Here Not There is the second studio album by Canadian singer-songwriter Jane Child, released in 1993 by Warner Bros. Records. It was less successful than her 1989 debut and saw her undergoing a stylistic change; while her debut was mostly synthesized dance-pop with R&B undercurrents, Here Not There saw her edging away and mixing new jack swing rhythms with almost hard rock elements. The year prior to the release of the album, she contributed the song "Mona Lisa Smiles" to the film Freejack, which starred Emilio Estevez.

The album is notable in that it featured an outside writer in the form of Ricky Hyslop, her father; he wrote two tracks on the album ("Monument" and "Step Out Of Time"), whereas Child wrote all of the tracks on her previous album.

Reception
Allmusic's Stephen Thomas Erlewine gave the album two stars of five stars, calling it "a more ambitious affair than her debut", but also said that she "did not write songs that could have elaborated her ideas".

Track listing

Personnel
Musicians
Jane Child – lead vocals, keyboards, synthesizers, synthesized bass, Hammond organ, programming, string arrangements
James Harrah – guitars, bass, programming
Bryan Hyslop – guitars
Ricky Hyslop – guitars, backing vocals
Aaron Gross – percussion
Tal Bergman – drums, percussion

Production
 Jane Child – arrangement, production
 James Harrah – arrangement
 Paul Arnold – recording, engineering
 Jon Baker – recording, engineering
 Greg Droman – recording, engineering
 Michael Scott – recording, engineering
 Chris Lord-Alge – mixing
 Paul Lani – mix assistant
 Talley Sherwood – mix assistant
 Stephen Marcussen – mastering
 Jamie Seyberth – mastering

References

External links
 
 

1993 albums
Jane Child albums
New jack swing albums
Hard rock albums by Canadian artists
Warner Records albums